Magic Time may refer to:

 Magic Time (Van Morrison album), 2005
 Magic Time (Opa album), 1977
 Magic Time (compilation album), a 2001 compilation album
 Magic Time (novel series), by Marc Scott Zicree, 2002-2005

See also
 Time and Magik, a trilogy of text adventure games by Level 9